Yorleys Mena Palacios (born 20 July 1991) is a Colombian footballer who currently plays for César Vallejo.

Club career
Mena made his professional debut on 1 November 2009 for Independiente Medellín in a 2–1 win over Cúcuta Deportivo, Mena started the match but was substituted by Felipe Pardo in the 28th minute. In Mena's debut season Medellín won the 2009 Torneo Finalización after defeating Atlético Huila 3–2 on aggregate in the final. After playing less than 20 games in three seasons, Mena was loaned to Real Cartagena who played in the Categoría Primera B, the second division football league in Colombia.

Mena played the 2013 season with Real Cartanega where he appeared in 37 league matches and scored 12 goals. Mena was the top scorer of the 2013 Copa Colombia, he scored 14 goals in 12 matches for Cartanega and helped his team reach the semifinals where they lost to Millonarios 6–3 on aggregate.

Mena returned to Independiente Medellín for the 2014 Categoría Primera A season where he helped the team reach the Torneo Finalización final. On 11 December 2014, Liga MX club Monarcas Morelia announced Mena would be joining the club after the Torneo Finalización final. Mena started both legs of the final but Medellín lost 3–2 on aggregate to Santa Fe.

In December 2015, Mena was transferred on loan to Ascenso MX team, Club Universidad de Guadalajara

Honours

Club
Independiente Medellín
Categoría Primera A: 2009-II

Individual
Copa Colombia top scorer: 2013

References

External links

Living people
1991 births
Colombian footballers
Colombian expatriate footballers
Independiente Medellín footballers
Real Cartagena footballers
Atlético Morelia players
Atlético Junior footballers
América de Cali footballers
Alianza Petrolera players
Deportivo Pereira footballers
Club Deportivo Universidad César Vallejo footballers
Ajman Club players
Categoría Primera A players
Categoría Primera B players
Liga MX players
Peruvian Primera División players
UAE Pro League players
Association football forwards
Expatriate footballers in Mexico
Expatriate footballers in Peru
Expatriate footballers in the United Arab Emirates
Colombian expatriate sportspeople in Mexico
Colombian expatriate sportspeople in Peru
People from Apartadó
Sportspeople from Antioquia Department